Wafangdian West railway station is a railway station situated in Wafangdian, Dalian, Liaoning, China. It opened along with the Harbin–Dalian high-speed railway on 1 December 2012.

References

Railway stations in China opened in 2012
Railway stations in Liaoning